Legend of the Mask and the Assassin is a collaborative studio album by American Los Angeles-based record producer DJ Muggs and Psycho Realm's rapper Sick Jacken featuring fellow Sick Symphonies' member Cynic of Street Platoon. It was released on September 11, 2007 via Rebel Music Group/Universal Music Latino, serving as Muggs' second album in his "DJ Muggs vs." series. Recording sessions took place at MGS Sound Lab in Burbank, California. Production was handled entirely by Muggs, who also served as executive producer with Jacken.

Track listing

Personnel 
Joaquin Gonzalez – main artist, vocals, executive producer
Lawrence Muggerud – main artist, scratches (tracks: 2, 10, 13), arranger, producer, executive producer
Richard Alfaro – featured artist (tracks: 1-4, 6-8, 10, 12, 13, 15, 16)
Khalil Abdul-Rahman – keyboards (tracks: 1, 2, 4, 5, 10, 13)
Rogelio Lozano – guitar (tracks: 1, 4, 5, 10, 12)
Steve Ferlazzo – keyboards (tracks: 2-4, 6-8, 10, 13, 15, 16)
Dave Abrams – scratches (track 2), engineering
Farid Nassar – scratches (track 3), percussion (track 8)
Daniel Seeff – guitar (tracks: 5, 8)
Ray Armando – congas (tracks: 5, 8)
Shavo Odadjian – sitar (track 5)
Richard "Segal" Huredia – mixing
Ernesto "Ern Dog" Medina – engineering
Brian Gardner – mastering

Charts

References

External links

2007 albums
DJ Muggs albums
Collaborative albums
Albums produced by DJ Muggs
Universal Music Latino albums